The morphology of the Welsh language has many characteristics likely to be unfamiliar to speakers of English or continental European languages like French or German, but has much in common with the other modern Insular Celtic languages: Irish, Scottish Gaelic, Manx, Cornish, and Breton. Welsh is a moderately inflected language. Verbs inflect for person, number, tense, and mood, with affirmative, interrogative, and negative conjugations of some verbs. There is no case inflection in Modern Welsh. 

Modern Welsh can be written, and spoken, in several levels of formality, for example colloquial or literary, as well as different dialects. The grammar described in this article is for Colloquial Welsh, which is used for speech and informal writing. Literary Welsh is closer to the form of Welsh used in the William Morgan's 1588 translation of the Bible and can be seen in formal writing. It does not reflect the spoken language presented here.

Initial consonant mutation

Initial consonant mutation is a phenomenon common to all Insular Celtic languages, although there is no evidence of it in the ancient Continental Celtic languages of the first millennium AD; nor was there any evidence of this in the Insular Celtic languages around the 500s. 

The first consonant of a word in Welsh may change when preceded by certain words (e.g. , and ), or because of some other grammatical context (such as when the grammatical object follows a conjugated verb). Welsh has three mutations: the soft mutation, the nasal mutation, and the aspirate mutation (also called spirant mutation in some grammars). These are also represented in the orthography:

*Soft mutation causes initial  to be deleted. For example,  "garden" becomes  "the garden"; or  "work" becomes  "his work".

A blank cell indicates no change.

The mutation  reflects a change heard in modern words borrowed from English. Borrowed words like  (chips) can often be heard in Wales and the mutated form  is also common.  (I'm going to get chips);  (I have chips). Despite this the 'ts' → 'j' mutation is not usually included in the classic list of Welsh mutations and is rarely taught in formal classes. Nevertheless, it is a part of the colloquial language and is used by native, first-language speakers.

These examples represent usage in the standard language; there is some regional and idiolectal variation in colloquial usage. In particular, the soft mutation is often used where nasal or aspirate mutation might be expected on the basis of these examples.

Mutation is not triggered by the form of the preceding word; the meaning and grammatical function of the word are also relevant. For example, while   meaning "in" triggers nasal mutation, homonyms of  do not.  For example:
In the sentence  ("There is plastic in Siaco's nose")  has undergone nasal mutation.
In the sentence  ("Siaco's nose is plastic" )  has undergone soft mutation, not nasal mutation.
In the sentence  ("Siaco's nose contains plastic")  is not mutated.

Soft mutation 

The soft mutation is by far the most common mutation in Welsh.  When words undergo soft mutation, the general pattern is that unvoiced plosives become voiced plosives, and voiced plosives become fricatives or disappear; some fricatives also change, and the full list is shown in the above table.

In some cases a limited soft mutation takes place.

Common situations where the limited soft mutation occurs include:

 Feminine singular nouns after the definite article, e.g.  'the war', not *;  'the windpipe', not *.
 Feminine nouns following the numeral  (one), e.g.  'one war', not *;  'one windpipe', not *.
 Nouns or adjectives used predicatively or adverbially after .

Common situations where the full soft mutation occurs are as follows – note that this list is by no means exhaustive:

 Qualifiers (adjectives, nouns, or verb-nouns) used to qualify feminine singular nouns, e.g.  'a big cat' [< ];  'a singing girl' [< ].
 Words immediately following the prepositions  ("for"),  ("on"),  ("to"),  ("under"),  ("over"),  ("through"),  ("without"),  ("until"),  ("by"),  ("by, near, beside, with"),  ("to"),  ("of, from") - note that this does not mean there is a one-to-one correspondence between Welsh and English prepositions!
 Nouns following the number two ( / )
 Nouns following adjectives (N.B. most adjectives follow the noun); i.e.  'old man' (from  'man').
 An object of a conjugated verb.
 Verb-nouns following an indirect object, i.e.  ('I must go').
 Inflected verbs in the interrogative and negative (also frequently, in the spoken language, the affirmative), though this should strictly be the 'mixed mutation'.

The occurrence of the soft mutation often obscures the origin of placenames to non-Welsh-speaking visitors.

Nasal mutation 
The nasal mutation normally occurs: 

 after  – generally pronounced as if spelt  – ("my") e.g.  ("a bed"),  ("my bed"), pronounced 
 after the locative preposition  ("in") e.g.  ("Tywyn"),  ("in Tywyn")
 after the negating prefix  ("un-") e.g.  ("fair"),  ("unfair").

Notes

1. The preposition  becomes  if the following noun (mutated or not) begins with m, and becomes  if the following noun begins with ng. E.g.  ("Bangor"),  ("in Bangor");  ("Cardiff"),  ("in Cardiff").  

2.

3. In some dialects the soft mutation is often substituted after  giving forms like  for "in Cardiff", or it is even lost altogether, especially with place names, giving . This would be considered incorrect in formal registers.
   
Under nasal mutation, voiced stop consonants become nasals, and unvoiced stops become voiceless nasals. A non-standard mutation also occurs in some parts of North Wales where nasal consonants are also unvoiced, e.g.  ("my mother";). This may also occur (unlike the ordinary nasal mutation) after  ("her"): e.g.  ("her grandmother", standard ).

Aspirate mutation 
The name aspirate mutation can be misleading as the affected consonants do not become aspirated, but become fricatives. This is represented by the addition of an h after the original initial consonant (c , p , t  → ch , ph , th ), but the resultant forms are pronounced as single phonemes.

The aspirate mutation occurs:
 after the possessive  when it means "her" –  'her dog' (<  'dog')
 after  ("and") –  'coffee and cake' (<  'cake')
 after  ("with", "by means of") –  'cut with a knife' (<  'knife')
 after  ("with") –  'cake with coffee' (< coffi 'coffee')
 for nouns after the masculine numeral three –  'three fish(es)' (<  'fish')
 after the number six (written before a noun as ) –  'six children' (<  'child')
Aspirate mutation is the least-used mutation in colloquial Welsh. ("more than likely"). Its occurrence is unusual in the colloquial Southern phrase  ("that's why") as  causes the soft mutation, not aspirate mutation.

Mixed mutation 

A mixed mutation occurs when negating conjugated verbs. Initial consonants undergo aspirate mutation if subject to it, and soft mutation if not. In practice, soft mutation is often used even when aspirate mutation would be possible (e.g. ); this reflects the fact that aspirate mutation is in general infrequent in the colloquial language (see above).

h-Prothesis 
Under some circumstances an h is added to the beginning of words that begin with vowels, a process commonly called 'h-prothesis' and usually called pre-vocalic aspiration (PVA) by linguists. ("age"),  ("her age"). ("twenty-one", literally "one on twenty").

The article

Indefinite article
Welsh has no indefinite article. This means that indefiniteness is implied by the lack of definite article or determiner. The noun cath, therefore, means both 'cat' and 'a cat'.

English has no plural indefinite article proper, but often uses the word 'some' in place of one: compare "I have an apple" and "I have some apples", where the word 'some' is being used as an article because the English language calls for something in this position, compare "I have apples" and "I have some apples", the former is rarely encountered in English. In these types of English sentences, the word 'some' is therefore left untranslated due to there being no concept of an indefinite article in Welsh: mae gen i afalau ('I have [some] apples').

Definite article

The rules governing their usage are:

 When the previous word ends in a vowel, regardless of the quality of the word following,  is used, e.g.  ("the cat is outside"). This rule takes precedence over the other two.
 When the following word (usually a noun) begins with a vowel,  is used, e.g.  ("the garden").
 In all other places,  is used, e.g.  ("the boy").

The article triggers the soft mutation when it is used with feminine singular nouns, e.g.  "(a) princess" but  ("the princess").

The definite article is used in Welsh where it would not be used in English in the following ways:

To not allow a noun to be indefinite. In an English sentence like I'm going to school, the noun school has no article, but the listener is expected to know which school is being talked about. In Welsh this noun (ysgol) would take the definite article: dw i'n mynd i'r ysgol ('I'm going to school').
With demonstratives like this and that, which in Welsh are phrases equivalent to English the... here (this) and the... there (that), e.g. y bore 'ma (this morning); y gadair 'na (that chair).
In certain places where English uses an indefinite article. English phrases like one pound per kilogram / one pound a kilogram replace the indefinite article with the definite article, e.g. un bunt y cilogram.
In genitive constructions. English can again get away with no article in these phrases, e.g. Town Hall, City Centre. In Welsh these call for use of the definite article, e.g. Neuadd y Dref (Town Hall, lit. "hall of the town"); Canol y Ddinas (City Centre, lit. "centre of the city").

Nouns

As in most other Indo-European languages, all nouns belong to a certain grammatical gender; the genders in Welsh are masculine and feminine. A noun's gender usually conforms to its referent's natural gender when it has one (e.g.  'mother' is grammatically feminine), but otherwise there are no major patterns (except that, as in many languages, certain noun suffixes show a consistent gender, as sometimes do nouns referring to certain classes of thing, e.g. all months of the year in Welsh are masculine) and gender must simply be learnt.

Welsh has two systems of grammatical number. Singular/plural nouns correspond to the singular/plural number system of English, although unlike English, Welsh noun plurals are unpredictable and formed in several ways, i.e. the plural form cannot be discerned simply by its singular form. Most nouns form the plural with a suffix (the most common, by far, is ), e.g. . Others form the plural through vowel change (a process known as affection in Celtic languages), e.g.  'boy / boys'. Still others form their plurals through some combination of the two, e.g.  'sister / sisters'.

A few nouns also display a dual number, e.g. 'hand',  '(two) hands', though  also has the general plural . The dual  comes from combining  with the feminine numeral  'two';  is only used to refer to the hands of a single person, else  is used, e.g.

Welsh also has a special 'plural' for 'a period of three days',  which is commonly used across Wales.

The other system of grammatical number is the collective/singulative. Most nouns which belong in this system are frequently found in groups, for example,  "children" and  "a child", or  "trees" and  "a tree". In dictionaries, the collective form, being the root form, is given first.

Adjectives

Adjectives normally follow the noun they qualify, while a few, such as hen, pob, annwyl, and holl ("old", "every", "dear", "whole") precede it. For the most part, adjectives are uninflected, though there are a few with distinct masculine/feminine or singular/plural forms. After feminine singular nouns, adjectives receive the soft mutation.

Adjective comparison in Welsh is fairly similar to the English system. Adjectives with one or two syllables receive the endings  "-er" and  "-est", which change final b, d, g into p, t, c by provection, e. g.  "fair",  "fairer",  "fairest". Adjectives with two or more syllables use the words  "more" and  "most", e. g.  "sensitive",  "more sensitive",  "most sensitive". Adjectives with two syllables can go either way.
There is an additional degree of comparison, the equative, meaning "as ... as ...".

These are the possessive adjectives:
{| class="wikitable"
|- style="background: #efefef;"
| colspan="2" |
! scope="col" | Singular
! scope="col" | Translation
! scope="col" | Plural
! scope="col" | Translation
|-
! colspan="2" scope="row" style="background: #efefef;" | First Person
| , 
| my
| 
| our
|-
! colspan="2" scope="row" style="background: #efefef;" | Second Person
| 
| your, thy 
| 
| your
|-
! colspan="2" scope="row" style="background: #efefef;" | Third Person
| 
| his, her, its
| 
| their
|}

The possessive adjectives precede the noun they qualify, which is often followed by the corresponding form of the personal pronoun, e.g.  "my bread",  "your bread",  "his bread", etc. The corresponding pronoun is often dropped in the spoken language, fy mara (my bread), dy fara (your bread), ei fara (his bread) and ei bara (her bread).

The demonstrative adjectives are yma "this"' and yna "that" (this usage derives from their original function as adverbs meaning "here" and "there" respectively). They follow the noun they qualify, which also takes the article. For example,  "the book",  "this book",  "that book"; literally the book here and the book there.

Pronouns

Personal pronouns

The Welsh personal pronouns are:

{| class="wikitable"
|- style="background: #efefef;"
| colspan="2" |
! scope="col" | Singular
! scope="col" | Plural
|-
! colspan="2" scope="row" style="background: #efefef;" | First Person
| 
| 
|-
! colspan="2" scope="row" style="background: #efefef;" | Second Person
| 
| 
|-
! rowspan="2" scope="row" style="background: #efefef;" | Third Person
! scope="row" style="background: #efefef;" | Masculine
| 
| rowspan="2" | 
|-
! scope="row" style="background: #efefef;" | Feminine
| 
|}

The Welsh masculine-feminine gender distinction is reflected in the pronouns.

The English dummy or expletive "it" construction in phrases like "it's raining" or "it was cold last night" also exists in Welsh and other Indo-European languages like French, German, and Dutch, but not in Italian, Spanish, Portuguese, Indo-Aryan or Slavic languages. Unlike other masculine-feminine languages, which often default to the masculine pronoun in the construction, Welsh uses the feminine singular , thus producing sentences like:

 
 It's raining.

 
 It was cold last night.

However, colloquially the pronoun is often omitted when it would be translated as "it" in English, leaving:
 
 It's raining.

 
 It was cold last night.

Notes on the forms

 
 Did you see him over the weekend?

 and  exclusively are used as subjects with the inflected conditional:

 
 He ought to buy you a new one.

 
 Have you seen him today?

 
 I can't find my keys.

The use of first-person singular  is limited in the spoken language, appearing in  "to/for me" or as the subject with the verb , used in a preterite construction.

 is found most often as the second-person singular pronoun, however  is used as the subject of inflected future forms, as a reinforcement in the imperative, and as following pronoun to the possessive adjective  "your ..."

vs. 

, in addition to serving as the second-person plural pronoun, is also used as a singular in formal situations, as is in French and Russian. Conversely,  can be said to be limited to the informal singular, such as when speaking with a family member, a friend, or a child. This usage corresponds closely to the practice in other European languages.

Reflexive pronouns

The reflexive pronouns are formed with the possessive adjective followed by  "self". There is variation between North and South forms. The first person singular possessive pronoun fy is usually pronounced as if spelt .

{| class="wikitable"
|- style="background: #efefef;"
! scope="col" colspan="2" | 
! scope="col" | Singular
! scope="col" | Plural
|-
! scope="row" rowspan="3" style="background: #efefef;" | North
! scope="row" style="background: #efefef;" | First Person
| 
| 
|-
! scope="row" style="background: #efefef;" | Second Person
| 
| 
|-
! scope="row" style="background: #efefef;" | Third Person
| 
| 
|-
! scope="row" rowspan="3" style="background: #efefef;" | South
! scope="row" style="background: #efefef;" | First Person
| 
| 
|-
! scope="row" style="background: #efefef;" | Second Person
| 
| 
|-
! scope="row" style="background: #efefef;" | Third Person
| 
| 
|}

Note that there is no gender distinction in the third person singular.

Emphatic pronouns

Welsh has special emphatic forms of the personal pronouns. 

The term 'emphatic pronoun' is misleading since they do not always indicate emphasis. They are perhaps more correctly termed 'conjunctive, connective or distinctive pronouns' since they are used to indicate a connection between or distinction from another nominal element. For example, 'minnau' may on occasion be best translated 'I/me, for my part'; 'I/me, on the other hand', 'I/me, however', or even simply 'I/me'. Full contextual information is necessary to interpret their function in any given sentence.

{| class="wikitable"
|- style="background: #efefef;"
| colspan="2" |
! scope="col" | Singular
! scope="col" | Plural
|-
! colspan="2" scope="row" style="background: #efefef;" | First Person
| 
| 
|-
! colspan="2" scope="row" style="background: #efefef;" | Second Person
| 
| 
|-
! rowspan="2" scope="row" style="background: #efefef;" | Third Person
! scope="row" style="background: #efefef;" | Masculine
| 
| rowspan="2" | 
|-
! scope="row" style="background: #efefef;" | Feminine
| 
|}

The emphatic pronouns can be used with possessive adjectives in the same way as the simple pronouns are used (with the added function of distinction or connection).

Demonstrative pronouns

While the singular demonstrative pronouns this and that have separate forms for masculine and feminine, there is only a single plural form in each case (these, those). This is consistent with a general principle in Welsh that gender is not marked in the plural. The latter forms are also often used for intangible, figurative, or general ideas (though cf. also the use of 'hi' discussed above).

{| class="wikitable"
|- style="background: #efefef;"
| scope="col" |
! scope="col" | Masculine
! scope="col" | Feminine
! scope="col" | Intangible
|-
! scope="row" style="background: #efefef;" | this
| 
| 
| 
|-
! scope="row" style="background: #efefef;" | that
| 
| 
| 
|-
! scope="row" style="background: #efefef;" | these
! colspan="2" style="background: #f9f9f9; font-weight: normal" | 
! rowspan="2" style="background: #efefef;" | 
|-
! scope="row" style="background: #efefef;" | those
! colspan="2" style="background: #f9f9f9; font-weight: normal" | 
|}

In certain expressions,  may represent "now" and  may represent "then".

Verbs
In Colloquial Welsh, the majority of tenses and moods make use of an auxiliary verb, usually  "to be" or gwneud "to do". The conjugation of bod is dealt with in Irregular Verbs below.

There are five periphrastic tenses in Colloquial Welsh which make use of : present, imperfect, future, and (less often) pluperfect; these are used variously in the indicative, conditional and (rarely) subjunctive. The preterite, future, and conditional tenses have a number of periphrastic constructions, but Welsh also maintains inflected forms of these tenses, demonstrated here with  'pay' (pluperfect conjugation is rarely found beyond the verb 'bod').

{| class="wikitable"
|- style="background: #efefef;"
| colspan="2" |  — 'to pay'
! scope="col" | Singular
! scope="col" | Plural
|-
! scope="row" rowspan="3" style="background: #efefef;" | Preterite
! scope="row" style="background: #efefef;" | First Person
| 
| 
|-
! scope="row" style="background: #efefef;" | Second Person
| 
| 
|-
! scope="row" style="background: #efefef;" | Third Person
| 
| 
|-
! scope="row" rowspan="3" style="background: #efefef;" | Future
! scope="row" style="background: #efefef;" | First Person
| 
| 
|-
! scope="row" style="background: #efefef;" | Second Person
| 
| 
|-
! scope="row" style="background: #efefef;" | Third Person
| 
| 
|-
! scope="row" rowspan="3" style="background: #efefef;" | Conditional
! scope="row" style="background: #efefef;" | First Person
| 
| 
|-
! scope="row" style="background: #efefef;" | Second Person
| 
| 
|-
! scope="row" style="background: #efefef;" | Third Person
| 
| 
|}

Notes on the preterite:
Word-final -f is rarely heard in Welsh. Thus verbal forms in -af will be pronounced as if they ended in /a/ and they may be written thus in lower registers.
In some parts of Wales -s- may be inserted between the stem and plural forms.
Notes on the future:
 Note that the future was formerly also used as an inflected present. A small amount of frozen forms use the future forms as a present habitual: mi godaf i am ddeg o'r gloch bob bore - I get up at ten o' clock every morning
Notes on the conditional:
-s- or, -as, may be inserted between the stem and endings in the preterite and conditional (thus overlapping with the pluperfect in the latter case).

Questions are formed by effecting soft mutation on the verb (the effect of the interrogative particle 'a', often elided in speech and informal writing), though increasingly the soft mutation is being used in all situations. Negative forms are expressed with ddim after the pronoun and the mixed mutation, though here the soft mutation is taking over in informal registers ( for ).

Irregular verbs

and compounds

Bod 'to be' is irregular. In addition to having inflected forms of the preterite, future, and conditional, it also maintains inflected present and imperfect forms which are used frequently as auxiliaries with other verbs. Bod has separate conjugations for (a) affirmative and (b) interrogative and negative forms of the present indicative (there are also further variations in the third person singular, in the context of dependent clauses). The apparent high irregularity of this tense can be simplified and rationalised by tracing back the divergences to the standard formal written forms: e.g. 'dyw e ddim' and 'dydy e ddim' or 'dydi o ddim' (he is not) can all be seen as informal variants of 'nid ydyw ef (ddim)'.

The present tense in particular shows divergence between north and southern dialects. Though the situation is undoubtedly more complicated, King (2003) notes the following variations in the present tense as spoken (not as written according to the standard orthography):

{| class="wikitable"
|- style="background: #efefef;"
| rowspan="2" colspan="2" |
! colspan="2" scope="col" style="font-weight: normal;" | Affirmative (I am)
! colspan="2" scope="col" style="font-weight: normal;" | Interrogative (Am I?)
! colspan="2" scope="col" style="font-weight: normal;" | Negative (I am not)
|- style="background: #efefef;"
! scope="col" | Singular
! scope="col" | Plural
! scope="col" | Singular
! scope="col" | Plural
! scope="col" | Singular
! scope="col" | Plural
|-
! rowspan="3" scope="row" style="background: #efefef;" | North
! scope="row" style="background: #efefef;" | First Person
| 
| 
| 
| 
| 
| 
|-
! scope="row" style="background: #efefef;" | Second Person
| —, 
| 
| 
| 
| 
| 
|-
! scope="row" style="background: #efefef;" | Third Person
| 
| 
| 
| 
| 
| 
|-
! rowspan="3" scope="row" style="background: #efefef;" | South
! scope="row" style="background: #efefef;" | First Person
| 
| , —
| 
| 
| 
| 
|-
! scope="row" style="background: #efefef;" | Second Person
| —, 
| 
| 
| 
| —
| 
|-
! scope="row" style="background: #efefef;" | Third Person
| 
| 
| 
| 
| 
| 
|}

{| class="wikitable"
|- style="background: #efefef;"
| rowspan="2" colspan="2" |
! colspan="2" scope="col" style="font-weight: normal;" | Affirmative (I am)
! colspan="2" scope="col" style="font-weight: normal;" | Interrogative (Am I?)
! colspan="2" scope="col" style="font-weight: normal;" | Negative (I am not)
|- style="background: #efefef;"
! scope="col" | Singular
! scope="col" | Plural
! scope="col" | Singular
! scope="col" | Plural
! scope="col" | Singular
! scope="col" | Plural
|-
! rowspan="3" scope="row" style="background: #efefef;" | Preterite
! scope="row" style="background: #efefef;" | First Person
| 
| 
| 
| 
| 
| 
|-
! scope="row" style="background: #efefef;" | Second Person
| 
| 
| 
| 
| 
| 
|-
! scope="row" style="background: #efefef;" | Third Person
| 
| 
| 
| 
| 
| 
|-
! rowspan="3" scope="row" style="background: #efefef;" | Imperfect
! scope="row" style="background: #efefef;" | First Person
| 
| 
| 
| 
| 
| 
|-
! scope="row" style="background: #efefef;" | Second Person
| 
| 
| 
| 
| 
| 
|-
! scope="row" style="background: #efefef;" | Third Person
| 
| 
| 
| 
| 
| 
|-
! rowspan="3" scope="row" style="background: #efefef;" | Future
! scope="row" style="background: #efefef;" | First Person
| 
| 
| 
| 
| 
| 
|-
! scope="row" style="background: #efefef;" | Second Person
| 
| 
| 
| 
| 
| 
|-
! scope="row" style="background: #efefef;" | Third Person
| 
| 
| 
| 
| 
| 
|}

 also has a conditional, for which there are two stems:
{| class="wikitable"
|- style="background: #efefef;"
| rowspan="2" colspan="2" |
! colspan="2" scope="col" | Affirmative
! colspan="2" scope="col" | Interrogative
! colspan="2" scope="col" | Negative
|- style="background: #efefef;"
! scope="col" | Singular
! scope="col" | Plural
! scope="col" | Singular
! scope="col" | Plural
! scope="col" | Singular
! scope="col" | Plural
|-
! rowspan="3" scope="row" style="background: #efefef;" | 
! scope="row" style="background: #efefef;" | First Person
| 
| 
| 
| 
| 
| 
|-
! scope="row" style="background: #efefef;" | Second Person
| 
| 
| 
| 
| 
| 
|-
! scope="row" style="background: #efefef;" | Third Person
| 
| 
| 
| 
| 
| 
|-
! rowspan="3" scope="row" style="background: #efefef;" | 
! scope="row" style="background: #efefef;" | First Person
| 
| 
| 
| 
| 
| 
|-
! scope="row" style="background: #efefef;" | Second Person
| 
| 
| 
| 
| 
| 
|-
! scope="row" style="background: #efefef;" | Third Person
| 
| 
| 
| 
| 
| 
|}

  ("not") is added after the subject for negative forms of 
 There are many dialectal variations of this verb.
These are used for the declarative, interrogative and negative.
 In speech the future and conditional forms often receive the soft mutation in all situations.
 Welsh and other Celtic languages are unusual among the European languages in having no fixed words for "yes" and "no" (although many speakers do use 'ie' and 'na' in ways that mimic English usage).

A few verbs which have  in the verbnoun display certain irregular characteristics of  itself.  is the most irregular of these. It has preterite and conditional forms, which are often used with present and imperfect meaning, respectively. The present is conjugated irregularly:

{| class="wikitable"
|- style="background: #efefef;"
|
! scope="col" | Singular
! scope="col" | Plural
|-
! scope="row" style="background: #efefef;" | First Person
| 
| 
|-
! scope="row" style="background: #efefef;" | Second Person
| 
| 
|-
! scope="row" style="background: #efefef;" | Third Person
| 
| 
|}

The common phrase  "I don't know" uses a special negative form of the first person present. The initial d- in this form originates in the negative particle :  >  > .

and 

The four verb-nouns  "to go",  "to do",  "to get", and  "to come" are all irregular in similar ways.
{| class="wikitable"
|- style="background: #efefef;"
| rowspan="2" colspan="2" |
! colspan="2" scope="col" | 
! colspan="2" scope="col" | 
! colspan="2" scope="col" | 
! colspan="2" scope="col" | 
|- style="background: #efefef;"
! scope="col" | Singular
! scope="col" | Plural
! scope="col" | Singular
! scope="col" | Plural
! scope="col" | Singular
! scope="col" | Plural
! scope="col" | Singular
! scope="col" | Plural
|-
! rowspan="3" scope="row" style="background: #efefef;" | Preterite
! scope="row" style="background: #efefef;" | First Person
| 
| 
| 
| 
| 
| 
| 
| 
|-
! scope="row" style="background: #efefef;" | Second Person
| 
| 
| 
| 
| 
| 
| 
| 
|-
! scope="row" style="background: #efefef;" | Third Person
| 
| 
| 
| 
| 
| 
| 
| 
|-
! rowspan="3" scope="row" style="background: #efefef;" | Future
! scope="row" style="background: #efefef;" | First Person
| 
| 
| 
| 
| 
| 
| 
| 
|-
! scope="row" style="background: #efefef;" | Second Person
| 
| 
| 
| 
| 
| 
| 
| 
|-
! scope="row" style="background: #efefef;" | Third Person
| 
| 
| 
| 
| 
| 
| 
| 
|}

In the conditional, there is considerable variation between the North and South forms of these four irregular verbs. That is partly because the North form corresponds to the Middle Welsh (and Literary Welsh) imperfect indicative, while the South form corresponds to the Middle Welsh (and Literary Welsh) imperfect subjunctive.
{| class="wikitable"
|- style="background: #efefef;"
| rowspan="2" colspan="2" |
! colspan="2" scope="col" | 
! colspan="2" scope="col" | 
! colspan="2" scope="col" | 
! colspan="2" scope="col" | 
|- style="background: #efefef;"
! scope="col" | Singular
! scope="col" | Plural
! scope="col" | Singular
! scope="col" | Plural
! scope="col" | Singular
! scope="col" | Plural
! scope="col" | Singular
! scope="col" | Plural
|-
! rowspan="3" scope="row" style="background: #efefef;" | North
! scope="row" style="background: #efefef;" | First Person
| 
| 
| 
| 
| 
| 
| 
| 
|-
! scope="row" style="background: #efefef;" | Second Person
| 
| 
| 
| 
| 
| 
| 
| 
|-
! scope="row" style="background: #efefef;" | Third Person
| 
| 
| 
| 
| 
| 
| 
| 
|-
! rowspan="3" scope="row" style="background: #efefef;" | South
! scope="row" style="background: #efefef;" | First Person
| 
| 
| 
| 
| 
| 
| 
| 
|-
! scope="row" style="background: #efefef;" | Second Person
| 
| 
| 
| 
| 
| 
| 
| 
|-
! scope="row" style="background: #efefef;" | Third Person
| 
| 
| 
| 
| 
| 
| 
| 
|}

Prepositions

Prepositions are words like on, at, to, from, by and for in English. They often describe a relationship, spatial or temporal, between persons and objects. For example, 'the book is on the table'; 'the table is by the window'.

There are approximately two-dozen or so simple prepositions in modern colloquial Welsh. While some have clear-cut and obvious translations (heb ‘without’), others correspond to different English prepositions depending on context (i, wrth, am). As with all areas of modern Welsh, some words are preferred in the North and others in the South.

The main prepositions used in modern colloquial Welsh are:

 â
 am
 ar
 at
 cyn
 (o) dan
 dros (tros)
 efo (hefo)
 gan
 ger
 gyda
 heb
 hyd

 i
 mewn
 o
 oddiar (oddi ar)
 oddiwrth (oddi wrth)
 rhag
 rhwng
 tan
 trwy (drwy)
 tua
 wrth
 yn

Most of these (but not all) share the following characteristics:
 they cause mutation of the following word
 they inflect for person and number, similar to verbs
 they can be used with a following verbal noun

Inflected prepositions

When used with a personal pronoun, most prepositions insert a linking syllable before the pronoun. This syllable changes for each preposition and results in an inflection pattern similar to that found in Welsh verbs. Broadly speaking, the endings for inflected prepositions are as follows:

{| class="wikitable"
|- style="background: #efefef;"
| colspan="2" |
! scope="col" | Singular
! scope="col" | Plural
|-
! colspan="2" scope="row" | First Person
| 
| 
|-
! colspan="2" scope="row" | Second Person
| 
| 
|-
! rowspan="2" scope="row" | Third Person
! scope="row" | Masculine
| 
| rowspan="2" | 
|-
! scope="row" | Feminine
| 
|}

Notes

References 
King, G. (2003). Modern Welsh. Oxford: Routledge. 

Linguistic morphology
Welsh grammar